Poll Ramchandrarao "P.R." Shyamsunder (3 March 1924 – 15 May 1988) was an Indian cricketer. He played first-class cricket for Hyderabad, Madras and Mysore between 1944 and 1958.

See also
 List of Hyderabad cricketers

References

External links
 

1924 births
1988 deaths
Indian cricketers
Hyderabad cricketers
Tamil Nadu cricketers
Karnataka cricketers
People from Tumkur